Johanna Maislinger (born 23 October 1985) is an Austrian aviator and engineer, currently employed by with the German cargo carrier Aerologic. Since 2010 she has flown Boeing 777-200F freighters, initially as a First Officer, as a Senior First Officer from 2011 and as a Captain since 2018. She achieved wider media prominence in 2018-2020 when she claimed to have secured the necessary financial and logistical backing to go into space as a space tourist, on Soyuz MS-20, though she did not ultimately gain a seat on the mission. The Soyuz MS-20 mission launched 8 December 2021 without her on board.

Early life and career
Maislinger was brought up in the small Austrian town of Bad Goisern, Upper Austria. Her family own a substantial catering and hospitality business, based on Bad Goisern and the neighboring town of Bad Ischl. In 2004, she was accepted to attend the Lufthansa Group Flight School to train as a commercial pilot. After graduating in 2006, she joined Hamburg International as a First Officer and flew Boeing 737 and Airbus A320 aircraft across Europe. She also completed a Bachelor's Degree in Technology Engineering.

In 2009, she successfully applied to join the fledgling cargo carrier Aerologic, and she began flying their Boeing 777-200F aircraft on long-haul services from Leipzig and Frankfurt, to Asia and the United States. Maislinger initially served as a First Officer, before being promoted to Senior First Officer in 2011, when she was only 25, and to Captain in 2018.

In 2013, she began part-time study at Ludwig Maximilian University in Munich, Medical School, for a doctorate in medicine, a course which usually takes six years to complete, when studied full-time. The main purpose of this direction was the enable her to eventually apply to the European Space Agency as an astronaut. It was expected that ESA would begin their next round of astronaut recruitment in early 2021.

German female astronaut project
In March 2016, the German Aerospace recruitment agency HESpace launched a private campaign called Die Astronautin, which had the objective of finding, and flying, a German female astronaut, before 2020. The organizers hoped to find corporate and private sponsors, who would finance a flight on a Russian, or American spacecraft. Maislinger was one of 400 applicants, who would be reduced to two finalists,  based on a selection process overseen by the German Space Agency DLR. Although she was Austrian, she had lived, worked, and studied in Germany for many years, and hoped to obtain German citizenship before the final two finalists were chosen. However, before her nationality became a major issue, Maislinger was eliminated, after reaching the final 30 candidates.

Space tourist project
In April 2017, after leaving the Die Astronautin project she revealed, via her social media network, that she had been invited to participate in another 'woman in space' project, which would see her sent into space on a Russian Soyuz spacecraft in 2019. The transaction was to be facilitated by the American company Space Adventures. Her main sponsor was said be an unknown, wealthy benefactor, based in Berlin. Other supporters, or sponsors, connected to the project included the Austrian company Red Bull, and their associate company Red Bull TV. In the event, the only available Soyuz seat in 2019, was sold to the United Arab Emirates Government.

After Space Adventures announced a new Space Tourism flight, in February 2019, which would fly as Soyuz MS-20 in December 2021, Maislinger's name was immediately linked to the project. In private correspondence with spaceflight author and researcher, Tony Quine, Space Adventures confirmed that Maislinger was a client, who was in contention for the Soyuz MS-20 spaceflight.

In November 2020 the respected online publication The Space Review revealed that officials at Space Adventures had confirmed, unofficially, that Maislinger was still a candidate to be launched into Space onboard Soyuz MS-20 in December 2021, with experienced cosmonaut Alexander Misurkin and an unnamed Japanese woman. This would have been the first time that two women have been launched, together, on a Soyuz, or any Russian spacecraft, but in 2021 it was announced that Maislinger did not gain the seat. 

In July 2021, Space Adventures Moscow Office changed their story and said that Maislinger had never had access to the funds she had claimed, and they had never treated her as a serious candidate. It is unclear why Maislinger, a respected professional, allowed the media, and internet, speculation and circus to build up around her, over a period of almost four years.

The only previous Austrian to fly in space was engineer Franz Viehböck who participated in the AustroMir 91 project, launched on Soyuz TM-13 in 1991.

On 8 December 2021 the Soyuz MS-20 mission launched; on board were cosmonaut Alexander Misurkin and two space tourists (both male), the Japanese billionaire Yusaku Maezawa and his assistant Yozo Hirano.

Personal life
Away from her professional life, and studies, Maislinger regards herself as a versatile Extreme Sports specialist. She holds aerobatics and seaplane pilot ratings, also participating in mountaineering, climbing, sky-diving, cross-country skiing and horse-riding.

References

1985 births
Living people
Austrian aviators
Space tourists